Robert Eugene Pincham (June 28, 1925 – April 3, 2008) was an American attorney active in the field of civil rights who served as both a judge of the Circuit Court of Cook County and later a judge of the Appellate Court of Illinois.

Early life and career
R. Eugene Pincham was born June 28, 1925. He was raised in Athens, Alabama. He attended LeMoyne College in Memphis, Tennessee and later earned a Bachelor of Science from Tennessee State University in Nashville, Tennessee. He then earned his J.D. degree at Northwestern University's School of Law. He was admitted to the Illinois State Bar in 1951 and the U.S. Supreme Court Bar in 1965.

Judicial career
He became a Judge of the Cook County Circuit Court in 1976. Howard C. Ryan, the chief justice of the Illinois Supreme Court, appointed Pincham to a vacancy created by the death of Kenneth Wilson. The appointment began June 11, 1984. He won election to the Appellate Court in 1986. In 1989, Pincham resigned to run for President of the Cook County Board of Commissioners in 1990, with an effective resignation date of December 29. Joseph Gordon, a former circuit court judge, was appointed to Pincham's vacancy. Pincham lost the Democratic primary to Richard Phelan.

Mayoral campaign

After then-Cook County Commissioner Danny K. Davis lost the Democratic primary to Richard M. Daley, the mayoral nominee of the Harold Washington Party stepped down to allow party leaders to appoint Pincham as the candidate. Pincham ultimately failed to mobilize African American support in the campaign and lost by a roughly three to one margin.

Subsequent career
In 1996, Pincham ran for Cook County State's Attorney under the Justice Party ballot line. He placed third, with 9.31% of the vote.

Death and legacy
R. Eugene died of complications from lung and brain cancer at his home in the Chatham neighborhood. The funeral was held in private at Trinity United Church of Christ, and culminated in remarks by Rev. Jeremiah Wright Jr. A member of the American Civil Liberties Union and a lifetime member of the NAACP, the semi-retired Pincham lectured and instructed in trial and appellate techniques and advocacy. He received numerous awards for his professional and community service and activism. He was also an ardent critic of the U.S. criminal justice system (also see Race Inequalities in the Criminal Justice System). Known for his dramatic oratory which drew on his own personal struggles and those of African Americans, and his tireless advocacy on behalf of those less able to speak for themselves, he was regarded by many in Illinois and particularly the African-American community, as a political and legal icon, and held as a role model by both blacks and whites who came behind him.

References

External links
More detailed article.

Illinois lawyers
Lawyers from Chicago
African-American lawyers
African-American people in Illinois politics
African-American judges
Activists for African-American civil rights
1925 births
2008 deaths
20th-century American judges
Tennessee State University alumni
Northwestern University Pritzker School of Law alumni
Judges of the Circuit Court of Cook County
20th-century American lawyers
20th-century African-American people
21st-century African-American people